Velladainatha Swami Temple is a Hindu temple situated in the village of Thirukkarukavur in the Mayiladuthurai district of Tamil Nadu, India.

Legend 
Thirukarugavur is believed to be the place when the Saivite saint Sundarar was purified of the sin of killing Jains who lost in debate with him. The temple tank in front of the temple is believed to turn white during new moon day of Tamil month of Thai (January - February).

Significance 
It is one of the shrines of the 275 Paadal Petra Sthalams - Shiva Sthalams glorified in the early medieval Tevaram poems by Tamil Saivite Nayanar Tirugnanasambandar and Sundarar

Deity 
The presiding deity is Somaskanda. The goddess is Kaviaganni. There are shrines to Ganesha, Durga, Murugan and his consorts Valli and Deivayanai.

References 

 

Shiva temples in Nagapattinam district
Padal Petra Stalam